The Port Revel Shiphandling Training Centre is a French maritime pilotage school that trains pilots, masters, and officers on large ships like supertankers, container ships, LNG carriers and cruise ships . The facility uses manned models at a 1:25 scale on a man-made lake designed to simulate natural conditions including harbours, canals, and open seas. It was the first such facility in the world.  The Centre was created in 1967 near Grenoble, France, by Laboratoire Dauphinois d'Hydraulique (now Artelia).

The courses are given by former maritime pilots. Since 1967, the Centre has trained over 6 500 maritime pilots, captains and officers from all over the world. French, European, Australian, Brazilian and North American pilots make up 90% of the Centre's students.

The manned model training regime is now recommended by the International Maritime Organization under Resolution A 960 (23) of December 2005.

The facility was written about by John McPhee in an October, 1998 article for The Atlantic Monthly, later republished as Chapter Two in his book Uncommon Carriers (2006).

History 
The centre's origin goes back to the fifties, when Port Revel's mother company, Sogreah, was studying bank erosion on the Suez Canal using model ships sailing on a scale model with a movable bed (i.e. granular material subjected to erosion by turbulent water movement).

At the end of the sixties this experience with free sailing model ships was used by Esso to anticipate the manoeuvring behaviour of the new, much larger, oil tankers.

After three years spent with Esso captains between 1967 and 1970, the Centre was taken over by Sogreah in 1970.

During the 1970s, most students were captains, while the first maritime pilots came to discover the centre.

In the 1990s, the first refresher courses were organised for pilots, who returned every 5 years. These courses are less directive and leave more room for customisation, which is a way of optimising port operations to increase port accessibility.

Manned model shiphandling training has improved over the years because:

 the instructors have become more proficient in delivering the courses and in their ability to structure courses as required,
 lake facilities have undergone changes, such as the creation of extensive shallow water areas with currents, and can mimic specific port scenarios,
 all kinds of large ships are available and model electronics have become more sophisticated in order to reproduce real ship manoeuvring behaviour,
 tugs have become a part of the courses since 2000, providing realistic capability for berthing/unberthing operations and escort work,
 pod propulsion is available since 2006,
 introducing quality assurance has increased the reliability of ships and equipment,
 the lake area was extended from four to five hectares during the winter 2008-2009,
 a large container ship (8 500 TEU) was added to the fleet in 2009,
 a large LNG carrier of 266 000 m3, the Q-Max, was added in 2010,
 a Controllable-pitch propeller (CPP) was introduced in 2013,
 a cruise ship (5000 people) with 2 pods and powerful bow thrusters was added in 2014.

Manned models 
Manned models are small scale models that can carry and be handled by at least one person on an open expanse of water. They must behave like real ships, giving the shiphandler the same sensations. Wind, currents, waves, water depths, channels and berths must be reproduced realistically.

Manned models are used for research (e.g. ship behaviour), engineering (e.g. port layout) and for training in shiphandling (e.g. maritime pilots, masters and officers). They are usually at 1:25 scale.

The aim of training on manned models is to enable seamen to acquire or to develop manoeuvring skills through a better understanding of a ship's behaviour as it sails in restricted water conditions at manoeuvring speed. Manned models are considered by ships' captains and maritime pilots as the next best thing to a full-scale prototype for understanding a ship's behaviour. Training on the scale models provides experience that could never be gained on real ships for the simple reason that neither ship-owners nor local authorities would allow such risks to be taken. Scale models allow the shiphandler to make mistakes. Scale models allow experimentation on ship behaviour to explore unknown fields beyond the limits of safety.

Periodic training on scale models will maintain shiphandling skills at their highest level and periodic evaluations will show it.

Those who have trained on both claim that scale models are complementary to computer simulators. While manoeuvres with currents, waves, tugs, anchors, bank effects, etc. are reproduced more accurately on scale models, numerical simulators are more realistic when it comes to the bridge environment.

In an ideal world, shiphandling training would consist of three things:

1. Training on board real ships: the environment is obviously realistic, but the time spent and the acceptable risks are limited.

2. Training on manned models: manoeuvres can be pushed beyond the safety limits and ships sail on real water, but there is limited reproduction of the captain's vision and of wind conditions.

3. Training on numerical simulators: the water and ships are simply equations, but the bridge and 360° vision are realistic enough to simulate Bridge Team Management and crisis management.

Lake 
The 5 hectare lake is located in the lower Alps near Grenoble where the wind regime is very mild. Moreover, it is sheltered by a forest. Hence uncontrolled wind effects on ships are minimised.

At 1:25 scale, the lake area represents a navigable zone of about 5 by 2 nautical miles, allowing several models to sail at the same time at normal manoeuvring speeds and to berth at one of the 50 berths and piers. Shallow and very shallow water areas (less than 10% under keel-clearance for certain ships) are to be found on about 50% of the lake area.

The lake is fitted with wave, current and wind generators and complex port approach configurations. Around 40% of the lake is subjected to currents.

Fleet 
The model ships are all at 1:25 scale. There are 11 ships and 4 tugs. All ships are equipped with indicators giving rudder angle, engine speed, ship speed, wind speed, etc. Most of the ships are equipped with bow and stern thrusters and anchors. Five ships are equipped with a DGPS tracking system. Training with special features like Becker rudder, Schilling rudder, CPP is available.

See similitude of ship models for details of the scaling factors involved.

References 
 IMPA, 2014 - IMPA on Pilotage - pp161–169
 John Mc Phee, 2006 - Uncommon Carriers - pp43–65
 Michel R. Denis, 2006 - Récits Insolites - p49 & p113
 The Nautical Institute, 1997 - On Pilotage and Shiphandling - p37, p181, p260, p280, p305

External links 
 Port Revel website
 AFCAN website
 Marine-Marchande.net website

Education in France
Maritime colleges in France
Model boats
Scale modeling
Buildings and structures in Isère
Education in Auvergne-Rhône-Alpes